William Hartigan may refer to:

 Bill Hartigan (born 1934), Australian politician
 William Hartigan (British physician) (1852–1936), physician for the Hongkong Shanghai Banking Corporation
 William Hartigan (Irish surgeon) (1756–1812)